Denise Meunier (6 January 1918 – 16 December 2022) was a French schoolteacher and resistant.

Biography
Meunier was born in the 1st arrondissement of Paris on 6 January 1918 to a sommelier father and a café cashier mother. Her parents settled in Rouen after her birth. In 1935, she began training as a teacher and graduated in 1938. She began teaching in a small village before moving back to Rouen.

At the start of the 1940 school year, Meunier was sent to Dieppe in the midst of the German occupation. After Feldman's death, she joined Francs-Tireurs et Partisans as a liaison agent for Roland Leroy.

After World War II ended, Meunier was briefly in charge of the Jeunesses communistes, replacing Roland Leroy, before returning to her job as a schoolteacher in Canteleu and later in Grenoble. In Isère, she joined the  alongside , where she became departmental president in 2010.

Meunier died in Moirans on 16 December 2022, at the age of 104.

Distinctions
Knight of the Legion of Honour (2014)
Medal of the city of Dieppe (2013)
Medal of the city of Moirans (2021)

References

1918 births
2022 deaths
People from Paris
Chevaliers of the Légion d'honneur
Communist members of the French Resistance
French centenarians
Women centenarians